Glaridothrips is a genus of thrips in the family Phlaeothripidae.

Species
 Glaridothrips koptus

References

Phlaeothripidae
Thrips genera